Giorgio Carpi (1 November 1909 in Verona – 30 June 1998 in Rome) was an Italian former professional footballer who played as a midfielder.

Career
Carpi played 6 seasons (36 games, no goals) in the Italian Serie A for A.S. Roma. He is a member of the A.S. Roma Hall of Fame.

References

External links
Profile at Enciclopediadelcalcio.it 

1909 births
Year of death missing
Italian footballers
Serie A players
A.S. Roma players
Association football midfielders